The following is a list of characters in the Malazan Book of the Fallen epic fantasy series by Steven Erikson, as well as characters who appear in the Novels of the Malazan Empire by Ian Cameron Esslemont.

The 'Appears in' column gives book names in their short form. Here is a legend ordered from oldest book to newest—GotM (Gardens of the Moon), DG (Deadhouse Gates), MoI (Memories of Ice), HoC (House of Chains), MT (Midnight Tides), BH (The Bonehunters), RG (Reaper's Gale), TH (Toll the Hounds), DoD (Dust of Dreams), CG (The Crippled God). For the Novels of the Malazan Empire—NoK (Night of Knives), RotCG (Return of the Crimson Guard), SW (Stonewielder), BB (Blood and Bone), OST (Orb Sceptre Throne), As (Assail).

 

A

B

C

D

E

F

G

H

I

J

K

L

M

N

O

P

Q

R

S

T

U

V

W

X

Y

Z

Malazan Book of the Fallen